Theodoros Papadimitriou (born 16 September 1973) is a retired Greek football striker.

References

1973 births
Living people
Greek footballers
Apollon Smyrnis F.C. players
Ethnikos Asteras F.C. players
Aiolikos F.C. players
Panachaiki F.C. players
Super League Greece players
Association football forwards
Sportspeople from the North Aegean
People from Mytilene